Nikolay Ustryalov may refer to:

 Nikolay Gerasimovich Ustryalov (1805–1870), Russian historian
 Nikolay Vasilyevich Ustryalov (1890–1937), his grand nephew, pioneer of Russian National Bolshevism